The  is a pond within Ueno Park (a spacious public park located in the Ueno section of Taitō, Tokyo, Japan), and a historically prominent Shitamachi feature often appearing in history and works of art. The park occupies the site of the former Kan'ei-ji, a temple closely associated with the Tokugawa shōguns, who had built it to guard Edo Castle against the northeast, a direction believed to be unlucky by traditional geomancy. The temple was destroyed during the Boshin War. The pond, although modified many times and even once drained, is natural.

Position and Dimensions

Situated in the south of Ueno Park, the pond is divided in three sections (see map), one called  because of the plants that during the summer completely cover its surface, one called  from the rental boats it hosts, and the third called , which lies within the limits of the Ueno Zoo and takes its name from the birds that inhabit it.

The pond has a circumference of about 2 km and a surface of about 1,100,000m2. To the north it borders with the Ueno Zoo, to the east with Keisei Ueno Station, to the south and to the west with Shinobazu Dori.

The park is divided in three parts by two promenades.

Origin of the name
According to the stone inscription on Benten Island, the area between the Ueno Plateau and the Hongo Plateau used to be called , and the pond just took its name from it, but there are alternative theories. According to one, the early name  due to the presence of bamboo grass later turned into Shinobazu. Another claims the name comes from the habit of young men and women to meet secretly here.

History and Changes
In the Jōmon period the entire place used to be just a cove of Tokyo Bay. Later, some centuries into the Common Era, the sea withdrew, leaving behind extensive marshes that covered most of the old Shitamachi. The pond is what remains of those marshes. We know that by the 15th Century the present name was already in use.

In 1625 the Edo shogunate had the Kan'ei-ji built here as a counterpart to Hieizan's Enryakuji in West Japan. The temple's founder Jigen Daishi (Tenkai), liking Lake Biwa, had Benten Island built in imitation of Chikubushima, and then the Bentendo on it. At the time the island was accessible only by boat, but later a stone bridge was added on the east, making it possible to walk to it.

The pond's shape until the beginning of the Meiji Era was very different from now, in particular the northern part where the Ueno Zoo is, which was much wider. At the time, the Aizomegawa flowed into it. In 1884 however, a cooperative horse racing company, wanting to open a racing track, had the pond partly filled, bringing it to the present shape and size. The first horse race took place in the November of the same year in the presence of the Emperor, and until 1892 races took place every spring and summer.

In 1929 more work divided the pond in four distinct parts. The boat rental business, which continues to the present day, was started in 1939. Today's Cormorants Pond is the result of the fusion of two of those four sections.

During World War II water was pumped out and the pond divided into rice paddies (the so-called . There was later, among others, a plan to build a baseball field on it, but in 1949 it was decided to return the pond to its original form which we still see today.

In September 1967 a hole was opened by accident in the pond during the construction of Tokyo Metro Chiyoda Line, and approximately 30 thousand tons of water flowed away.

In the years between 1990 and 1994, the city authorities installed water purification equipment.

Nature

Birds
The pond hosts several dozens of types of migratory and stationary birds, whose number at times is over ten thousand. Among them particularly numerous are tufted ducks, pochard, and northern pintails.

Fish
The pond contains numerous species of fish.

Plants
The lotuses of Lotus Pond, fully grown in summer, cover the entire surface of the water, hiding it almost completely.

Other Fauna
In June 2006, alligator snapping turtles, which are a non-native species, were found in the pond, and there is the possibility that they are breeding. Since then, authorities have posted warnings against alligator snapping turtles and snapping turtles.

Famous Literary Works That Mention The Pond
 Mori Ōgai – Gan (The Wild Geese)
 Yasunari Kawabata – Boshi Jiken (帽子事件)
 Miri Yu - Tokyo Ueno Station (novel) (Japanese: JR上野駅公園口, Hepburn: JR Ueno-Eki Kōenguchi)

Nearby Places of Interest
 Ueno Tōshō-gū shrine
 Saigō Takamori statue
 Shitamachi Museum
 
  Shrine
 Ueno Zoo

Access
  Keisei Ueno Station
        Ueno Station
   Okachimachi Station
  Ueno-hirokoji Station
  Ueno-okachimachi Station
  Naka-okachimachi Station
  Yushima Station
  Nezu Station

Other information
 The area around the pond used to be the Mecca of Tokyo's homeless, but in 2006 the area was cordoned off and the homeless sent away.
 In the video game Shin Megami Tensei IV the player's party encounter and kill a powerful demon in the pond.

References
 Archive Material and Leaflet from the Shitamachi Museum
This article is a translation of the article 不忍池 of Japanese Wikipedia accessed on January 2008. The references above quoted are those of the original article.

Some material also taken from the following source:
 Edward Seidensticker: Low City, High City: Tokyo from Edo to the Earthquake: how the shogun's ancient capital became a great modern city, 1867–1923

External links

Panoramic view of the Pond
 Ueno Park's Map in English

Ueno Park
Parks and gardens in Tokyo
Ponds of Japan